Cyclobutadiene is an organic compound with the formula . It is very reactive owing to its tendency to dimerize. Although the parent compound has not been isolated, some substituted derivatives are robust and a single molecule of cyclobutadiene is quite stable. Since the compound degrades by a bimolecular process, the species can be observed by matrix isolation techniques at temperatures below 35 K. It is thought to adopt a rectangular structure.

Structure and reactivity
The compound is the prototypical antiaromatic hydrocarbon with 4 π-electrons. It is the smallest [n]-annulene ([4]-annulene). Its rectangular structure is the result of the Jahn–Teller effect, which distorts the molecule and lowers its symmetry, converting the triplet to a singlet ground state. The electronic states of cyclobutadiene have been explored with a variety of computational methods. The rectangular structure is consistent with the existence of two different 1,2-dideutero-1,3-cyclobutadiene valence isomers. This distortion indicates that the pi electrons are localized, in agreement with Hückel's rule which predicts that a π-system of 4 electrons is not aromatic.

In principle, another situation is possible. Namely, cyclobutadiene could assume an undistorted square geometry, if it adopts a triplet spin state. While a theoretical possibility, the triplet form of the parent cyclobutadiene and its substituted derivatives remained elusive for decades. However, in 2017, the square triplet excited state of 1,2,3,4-tetrakis(trimethylsilyl)-1,3-cyclobutadiene was observed spectroscopically, and a singlet-triplet gap of EST = 13.9 kcal/mol (or 0.6 eV per molecule) was measured for this compound.

Synthesis
Several cyclobutadiene derivatives have been isolated with steric bulky substituents. Orange tetrakis (tert-butyl)cyclobutadiene arises by thermolysis of its isomer tetra-tert-butyltetrahedrane.

Trapping
Samples of cyclobutadiene are unstable since the compound dimerizes at temperatures above 35 K by a Diels-Alder reaction. By suppressing bimolecular decomposition pathways, cyclobutadiene is well-behaved. Thus it has been generated in a hemicarceplex. The inclusion compound is generated by photodecarboxylation of bicyclopyran-2-one. When released from the host–guest complex, cyclobutadiene dimerizes and then converts to cyclooctatetraene.

After numerous attempts, cyclobutadiene was first generated by oxidative degradation of cyclobutadieneiron tricarbonyl with ammonium cerium(IV) nitrate. When liberated from the iron complex, cyclobutadiene reacts with electron-deficient alkynes to form a Dewar benzene:

The Dewar benzene converts to dimethyl phthalate on heating at 90 °C.

One cyclobutadiene derivative is also accessible through a [2+2]cycloaddition of a di-alkyne. In this particular reaction the trapping reagent is 2,3,4,5-tetraphenylcyclopenta-2,4-dienone and one of the final products (after expulsion of carbon monoxide) is a cyclooctatetraene:

See also
Butadiene
Cyclobutene

References

Annulenes
Antiaromatic compounds
 
Four-membered rings